Mont Pourri (3,779 m) is a mountain in the Vanoise Massif in the Graian Alps. It is located in the Vanoise National Park, nearby Les Arcs ski resort.

References

External links
 
 Mont Pourri, France, Peakbagger.
 Refuge du Mont Pourri CAF 2370m (Refuge gardé)

Alpine three-thousanders
Mountains of the Graian Alps
Mountains of Savoie